The John Boy & Billy 250 was a NASCAR Craftsman Truck Series stock car race held at South Boston Speedway, in South Boston, Virginia. First held in 2001, the series ran once a year at the track through 2003, after which South Boston Speedway departed the series schedule. The scheduled race distance was 250 laps each year the race was held; no driver won the race more than once.

Past winners

2002 and 2003: Race extended due to a green–white–checker finish.

Manufacturer wins

References

External links
 

Former NASCAR races
NASCAR Truck Series races
NASCAR races at South Boston Speedway